The Balkan Wars Memorial Cemetery in Edirne, located at Sarayiçi quarter of Edirne, Turkey, is a memorial burial ground for Ottoman military personnel of the Balkan Wars (1912–1913), who were killed in action during the Siege of Adrianople (1912–13). It was opened to public on January 14, 1994.

Designed by architect Nejat Dinçel and built as a Tomb of the Unknown Soldier, it contains in twelve blocks the names of 100 officers and 400 soldiers on plaques.

In front of the memorial cemetery, an unknown-soldier monument with a bronze statue of an Ottoman soldier is erected, which was created by sculptor Tankut Öktem. The reliefs in the memorial depicting the Balkan Wars are of Metin Yurdanur.

Background
After Edirne (then known in English as "Adrianople") was captured by the Bulgarian 2nd Army on March 26, 1913, Turkish prisoners of war (POW) were put in a camp at Sarayiçi, who were treated with brutality. Around 10,000 POWs died due to cold, sickness and starvation. Only the names of few military personnel could be determined from the records of the General Staff.

On March 26, 2015, the 102nd anniversary of the fall of the city was commemorated at the memorial cemetery.

References

External links

1994 establishments in Turkey
Balkan Wars
Turkish military memorials and cemeteries
Buildings and structures in Edirne
 
Monuments and memorials in Turkey
Tombs of Unknown Soldiers
Tourist attractions in Edirne